Ah Wong is a surname. Notable people with the surname include:

Nigel Ah Wong (born 1990), New Zealand rugby union player
Rosie Ah Wong, New Zealand soccer player